The Unsinkable Molly Brown is a 1960 musical with music and lyrics by Meredith Willson and book by Richard Morris. The plot is a fictionalized account of the life of Margaret Brown, who survived the sinking of the RMS Titanic, and her wealthy miner-husband. A musical film version, also titled The Unsinkable Molly Brown, with screenplay by Helen Deutsch, was released in 1964.

Productions
The original Broadway production opened at the Winter Garden Theatre on November 3, 1960, and closed on February 10, 1962, after 532 performances and 1 preview. It was directed by Dore Schary and choreographed by Peter Gennaro. The opening cast included Tammy Grimes, Harve Presnell, and Jack Harrold. Grimes won the Tony Award for Best Featured Actress in a Musical. Grimes appeared in the US national tour in 1962, including Los Angeles and San Francisco in April and June 1962, respectively.

Presnell reprised his stage role for the 1964 film, also titled The Unsinkable Molly Brown starring Debbie Reynolds. The two starred in a 1989-1990 national tour.

The first West End production, with Abi Finley and Sean Pol McGreevy in the leading roles, opened in May 2009.

Revised versions
A reading of Molly Brown, the first of the revised versions by Dick Scanlan, took place in Denver at the Denver Center Theatre Company's Colorado New Play Summit in February 2009. The show was directed by Kathleen Marshall and starred Kerry O'Malley as Molly, Marc Kudisch as James Joseph "J.J." Brown, William Parry as Horace Tabor, and Linda Mugelston as Polly Pry. The story was revised "to use more elements from the real-life story" of Molly Brown.

A reading of the musical was held in May 2010. The show was directed/choreographed by Kathleen Marshall, music supervision by Michael Rafter, with Sutton Foster as Molly and Craig Bierko as J.J. Brown. This reading had only Molly and J.J. as characters, cutting out all others that were in the previous version.

Another reading of the musical by Scanlan was staged in December 2011. The creative team was the same as in May 2010, and it starred Foster and Kudisch again, Teal Wicks, Francis Jue and Zachary James, among others. About half the score is from the original musical and "the rest of the ‘new’ score is made up of songs from the late Willson's catalog."

Opening September 12, 2014, a full production of the Dick Scanlan revisioning was produced at the Denver Center for the Performing Arts, running through October 26. The production featured Beth Malone and Burke Moses. The plotline differed significantly from the original production, opening with Molly in the Titanic lifeboat, and then flashing back to follow her life from her first visit to Leadville. The production received favorable reviews from local reviewers and a notice in the New York Times, "A New Crew Salvages Old Molly Brown."

The revised Scanlan version opened on February 8, 2020 (previews) Off-Broadway at the Abrons Arts Center, presented by the Transport Group and directed and choreographed by Kathleen Marshall. Beth Malone and David Aron Damane star.

Plot
The following plot is that of the original 1960 Broadway production

In the early 20th century, feisty tomboy Molly Tobin wrestles with her three younger brothers and tells them and her father that she wants to learn to read and write and to find a rich husband ("I Ain't Down Yet"). Molly makes her way to the Saddle Rock saloon in Leadville, Colorado and applies for a job. On the way to Leadville, Colorado she meets J.J. "Leadville" Johnny Brown, who falls in love with her and promises to give her whatever she wants ("I'll Never Say No"). After they marry, Johnny sells a claim and provides Molly with the money she wants, enough to enter the high social life in Denver ("Beautiful People of Denver"). Molly and Johnny, now dressed in gaudy finery, are made fun of by the Denver society people she wants to impress, and they travel to Europe, against Johnny's better instincts.

The couple, and especially Molly, are welcomed and accepted by European royalty, but the attentions of Prince DeLong towards Molly upset Johnny and he returns to Leadville alone. Molly realizes that Johnny is her true love, and she sails for home on the RMS Titanic ("Dolce Far Niente"). As the Titanic sinks and the tragedy unfolds, Molly survives in one of the lifeboats. She finally is reunited with Johnny, who has built Molly her own "castle", a beautiful home in the Rocky Mountains.

Musical numbers

Act I
Overture—Orchestra
I Ain't Down Yet—Molly Tobin and Her Brothers 
Belly Up to the Bar, Boys—Molly Tobin, Christmas Morgan and the Miners
I've A'ready Started In—Johnny "Leadville" Brown, Christmas Morgan, Charlie, Burt and Gitter 
I'll Never Say No—Johnny "Leadville" Brown 
My Own Brass Bed—Molly Tobin
The Denver Police—Three Policemen 
Beautiful People of Denver—Molly Tobin 
Are You Sure?—Molly Tobin, Monsignor Ryan and Guests 
I Ain't Down Yet (Reprise)—Molly Tobin and Johnny "Leadville" Brown

Act II
Happy Birthday, Mrs. J. J. Brown—Princess DeLong, Prince DeLong and the International set 
Bon Jour (The Language Song)—Molly Tobin, Prince DeLong and the International set 
If I Knew—Johnny "Leadville" Brown 
Chick-a-pen—Molly Tobin and Johnny "Leadville" Brown
Keep-a-Hoppin'—Johnny "Leadville" Brown and His Leadville Friends 
Up Where the People Are—Monte Carlo Guests 
Dolce Far Niente—Prince DeLong and Molly Tobin 
Colorado, My Home—Johnny "Leadville" Brown, Molly Tobin and Leadville Friends

In popular culture
The song "I Ain't Down Yet" became a popular standard. Musicians who recorded it included Dinah Shore in 1961, Lester Lanin and his Orchestra in 1962, and John Gary in 1966. A version by Andre Kostelanetz was used as the theme for the children's TV show Wonderama, in which children in the audience waved their raised arms back and forth in time to the music during the opening credits.

The Gemini 3 capsule was nicknamed Molly Brown in reference to this musical, as Commander Gus Grissom's previous space capsule sank after splashdown.

References

External links
 
 Plot synopsis and other details at guidetomusicaltheatre.com
 The Unsinkable Molly Brown at the Music Theatre International website
 Internet Off-Broadway Database

1960 musicals
Broadway musicals
Cultural depictions of American women
Musicals inspired by real-life events
Plays set in the 1900s
Plays set in the 1910s
Plays based on actual events
Plays based on real people
RMS Titanic in fiction
Tony Award-winning musicals
Musicals by Meredith Willson